Elisabetta Mijno (born 10 January 1986) is an Italian Paralympic archer.

In the 2012 Summer Paralympics, Mijno won a silver medal. Then, at the 2016 Summer Paralympics, she won a bronze.

She studied medicine at the University of Turin in Orbassano, Italy. Her hobbies are travelling, photography and reading.

References

External links
 

Paralympic archers of Italy
Archers at the 2008 Summer Paralympics
Archers at the 2012 Summer Paralympics
Archers at the 2016 Summer Paralympics
Archers at the 2020 Summer Paralympics
Paralympic silver medalists for Italy
Paralympic bronze medalists for Italy
Living people
Italian female archers
1986 births
Medalists at the 2012 Summer Paralympics
Medalists at the 2016 Summer Paralympics
Paralympic athletes of Fiamme Azzurre
Paralympic medalists in archery
21st-century Italian women